The Seychelles National Chess Championship is a chess tournament organized by the Seychelles Chess Federation. There are separate championships for men and women and for varying age groups.

The championship is open to all Seychellois nationals.

List of Seychelles Men's Chess Champions
1992 - Frank Monthy
1993 - Ralph Kimende
1994 - Ralph Kimende
1995 - Divino Sabino
1996 - Benjamin Sonon
1997 - Michel Zialor
1998 - Benjamin Sonon
1999 - Benjamin Sonon
2005 - Richard Battin
2006 - Benjamin Hoaureau
2007 - Benjamin Hoaureau
2013 - Benjamin Hoaureau
2014 - Andre Stratonowitsch
2015 - Andre Stratonowitsch,  Eden Island hosted by Venture-Bay Seychelles.
2016 - Andre Stratonowitsch
2017 - Andre Stratonowitsch
2018 - FM Hartmut Metz

References

External links
 . Contact Details of the Seychelles Chess Federation

Chess national championships
Chess in Seychelles